Lizzie Ingham  (born 28 July 1988) is a New Zealand orienteer.

At the 2009 Oceania Orienteering Championships she won four gold medals, in sprint, middle, long and relay.

She placed 11th in the sprint, 18th in the middle and 13th in the long distance at the 2011 World Orienteering Championships.

At the 2012 World Orienteering Championships in Lausanne, she placed 9th in the sprint contest.

She placed 14th in sprint final at the 2013 World Orienteering Championships in Vuokatti. She also competed at the 2014, 2015, 2016 and 2017 World Orienteering Championships.

References

External links

1988 births
Living people
New Zealand orienteers
Foot orienteers